Delta Xi Nu Multicultural Sorority, Inc. is a sorority that was established at Texas A&M University in College Station, Texas. The sorority's nickname is the Xi Honeys.

History
Delta Xi Nu was established on October 7, 1997, by five women at Texas A&M University in College Station, Texas as a multicultural sorority. Its motto is "sisterhood, culture, education." Its five Founding Mothers are Jetje Brewton, Rena Kharbat, Adrienne Magirl, Lesliam Quiros, and Jaime Slaughter.

The sorority was inducted into the National Multicultural Greek Council (NMGC) in the fall of 2016.

Its national philanthropy is Domestic Violence Against Women. The individual chapters also have local charities. For example, the Alpha chapter has selected AIDs Awareness as its local charity.

Symbols 
The sorority's colors are red and silver. Its symbol is the butterfly. Its letters mean "Changing Old Ways to New".

Undergraduate chapters 
Following is a list of  Delta Xi Nu chapters. Active chapters are noted in bold, and inactive chapters are in italics.

Notes

Graduate chapters

References 

Fraternities and sororities in the United States
Student organizations established in 1997
1997 establishments in Texas